Mohammed Abu Naser (2 April 1921 – 12 May 2004) was a Bangladeshi educator. He was the 2nd vice-chancellor of Bangladesh University of Engineering and Technology (BUET). He is a recipient of the Ekushey Padak, one of the highest civilian awards in Bangladesh.

Early life and education
Naser was born in Munshiganj District in erstwhile East Pakistan to his parents Mr. M. Ismail Ali Khan and Abida Begum. He began his early education at the Kazir Pagla A. T. Institution at Lohajang Upazila in Munshiganj. In 1937 he passed the Matriculation Examination in the First Division. He completed the Intermediate Examination from the B. M. College, Barisal. He received the B.Sc (Hons.) and M.Sc. degrees, in Chemistry from the University of Dhaka, in 1942 and 1943 respectively. Then he went to the Bengal Engineering College at Shibpur, West Bengal to study Chemical Engineering.

He got a scholarship to study for his M.S. in Chemical Engineering at Johns Hopkins University in Baltimore, USA. This was a notable achievement for him to be selected for such a scholarship in undivided India. In 1962 he again went to United States for his Ph.D. He completed his Ph.D. in four years. Of four years, he spent about two years at Columbia University, and then he went to Texas A&M University to complete the rest of his Ph.D.. He went to London under a fellowship from the Nuffield Foundation to study for a year at the University of London In 1955.

Career
After returning to East Pakistan, Naser first joined at the Industries Ministry, and then joined at the Directorate of Technical Education. After a short while he joined the faculty in Ahsanullah Engineering College (later became BUET). In 1970 he became the vice-chancellor of BUET and continued holding his position after the liberation of Bangladesh. Naser is credited for the first convocation of BUET which was held in 1973. He became the chairman of the University Grants Commission in 1975. He retired from this position in 1980. He was a professor emeritus of Chemical Engineering in BUET until his death.

Achievements
Naser received the Ekushey Padak in 1987. Dr M. A. Naser Trust Fund is introduced at BUET to offer scholarship for poor and meritorious students of the university.

Death and legacy
Naser died on May 12, 2004. He had four children and eight grandchildren. Khan H. Zahid, the second son, is currently the chief economist and vice president of Riyad Bank.

References

University of Dhaka alumni
Education in Bangladesh
Recipients of the Ekushey Padak
2004 deaths
1921 births
Vice-Chancellors of Bangladesh University of Engineering and Technology
Indian expatriates in the United States
Pakistani expatriates in the United States